The 2023 Jacksonville State Gamescocks football team will represent Jacksonville State University as a member of Conference USA (C-USA) during the 2023 NCAA Division I FBS football season. The Gamecocks will be led by second-year head coach Rich Rodriguez and play home games at the Burgess–Snow Field at JSU Stadium in Jacksonville, Alabama.

Schedule
Jacksonville State and Conference USA announced the 2023 football schedule on January 10, 2023.

References

Jacksonville State
Jacksonville State Gamecocks football seasons
Jacksonville State Gamecocks football